The Imperial Pleasure Palace Schönbrunn, Courtyard Side, in German: Das kaiserliche Lustschloß Schönbrunn, Ehrenhofseite, is a painting dating back to the years of 1759 and 1760 by the Italian painter Bernardo Bellotto, depicting the palace of Schönbrunn in Vienna, after a renovation in 1744-49 by Nicolò Pacassi. It measures 135 cm × 235 cm in size and is located at the Kunsthistorisches Museum in Vienna, Austria. The work captures the historic moment on August 16, 1759, when empress Maria Theresa received the message that the Austrian army had won in battle against the Prussians at Kunersdorf.

References

18th-century paintings
Paintings by Bernardo Bellotto